The 2008 Biante Touring Car Masters was an Australian motor racing series for pre-1974 Touring Cars. It was the second annual Touring Car Masters.

Division 1 was won by Gavin Bullas driving a Ford Mustang and Division 2 by Greg East driving a Holden HQ.

Schedule

The series was contested over eight rounds.

Points system
Cars competed in two classes designated as Division 1 & Division 2.

Series points were awarded on the following basis in each Division in each race:

Where four races were run in a round, the points were awarded for Races 2, 3 & 4.

Each driver was permitted to count his/her best seven round results.

Series standings

References

Touring Car Masters
Touring Car Masters